José Agut (born 6 March 1961) is a Spanish former field hockey player who competed in the 1984 Summer Olympics.

References

External links
 

1961 births
Living people
Spanish male field hockey players
Olympic field hockey players of Spain
Field hockey players at the 1984 Summer Olympics